Thomas Wilson (born March 29, 1994) is a Canadian professional ice hockey right winger for the Washington Capitals of the National Hockey League (NHL). The Capitals selected him in the first round, 16th overall, of the 2012 NHL Entry Draft.

Born and raised in Toronto, Canada, Wilson began playing hockey at the age of two. He spent one year of minor ice hockey as a defenceman before switching to forward, where he could be more involved in the game. After spending time in the Greater Toronto Hockey League, the Plymouth Whalers of the Ontario Hockey League (OHL) selected Wilson in the second round of the 2010 OHL Draft. The following year, he helped Canada to capture gold medals at both the World U-17 Hockey Challenge and the Ivan Hlinka Memorial Tournament. His first two seasons of junior ice hockey were limited by injuries to his wrist, knee, and knuckle, but he attracted attention during the 2012 J. Ross Robertson Cup playoffs, scoring seven goals and six assists in 13 playoff games. After the Whalers' 2012–13 season concluded, Wilson joined the Capitals for the 2013 Stanley Cup playoffs, playing in two games against the New York Rangers.

Wilson made the Capitals' roster for the 2013–14 NHL season, serving on the fourth line as an enforcer. He missed the first part of his sophomore season with a broken fibula, but continued his aggressive, physical style of play into the remainder of the season, racking up a high level of penalty minutes. As Wilson's career progressed, he began to receive criticism from other teams for hits and checks to his opponents' heads. Wilson was first fined for checking in 2016, and received his first suspension during the 2017 preseason. His and the Capitals' Stanley Cup championship in 2018 was similarly overshadowed by a number of controversial hits during the playoffs, including one to Zach Aston-Reese that resulted in a three-game suspension. The NHL elected to suspend Wilson for 20 games that October, following an illegal hit to the head of Oskar Sundqvist during a preseason game against the St. Louis Blues. It was his fourth suspension in 105 games.

After serving the suspension, which was appealed and reduced to 14 games, Wilson began to retool his approach to the game, limiting his hits on his opponents and focusing instead on generating goals. During the 2018–19 NHL season, he set career highs in goals and points. In 2021, however, Wilson's performance as a power forward and enforcer came under fire from opposing coaches again after causing two serious injuries to other skaters: first Brandon Carlo of the Boston Bruins, followed by Artemi Panarin of the New York Rangers.

Early life
Wilson was born on March 29, 1994, in Toronto, Ontario, the largest city in Canada. He began playing ice hockey at the age of two, when his father built an ice rink in their backyard for Wilson and his older brother Peter. Wilson grew up playing alongside the sons of National Hockey League (NHL) players such as Tom Fitzgerald, Shayne Corson, and Steve Thomas, all of whom lived in Toronto and had children around Wilson's age. Both of his parents were minor ice hockey coaches at North Toronto Memorial Arena: his father Keven coached competitive "rep" teams, while his mother Neville coached the more recreational house league.

When he began playing minor hockey, Wilson was a defenceman, but he switched to playing forward after one year so that he could be involved in more plays. After three seasons playing AA minor hockey with North Toronto, Wilson joined the Toronto Jr. Canadiens of the Greater Toronto Hockey League (GTHL), where he scored 44 goals and 105 points in his final minor season. He also played in the GTHL for the Beresford Bisons, and split time between GTHL and his school team at Greenwood College School.

Playing career

Junior 
The Plymouth Whalers of the Ontario Hockey League (OHL) selected Wilson in the second round, 27th overall, of the 2010 OHL Priority Selection. Drafted at the age of 16, Wilson continued his education at Plymouth High School in Michigan while playing with the Whalers. Wilson took a physical, energetic approach to his junior ice hockey career at once, fighting to compete with his older teammates. His rookie 2010–11 season was limited to only 28 games after Wilson suffered a wrist injury during an international exhibition game, keeping him out of play for the second half of the season. In those 28 games, he scored three goals and three assists while racking up 71 penalty minutes.

Injuries continued to follow Wilson in the 2011–12 OHL season, including a sprained medial collateral ligament in his knee and a fractured knuckle. The latter injury occurred during the CHL/NHL Top Prospects Game, forcing Wilson to miss three weeks of games in February. In 49 regular-season games for Plymouth, Wilson recorded 27 points and 141 penalty minutes. During the J. Ross Robertson Cup playoffs, however, he established himself as a strong forward for the team, stepping in for an injured Stefan Noesen. In 13 playoff games, Wilson scored an additional seven goals and six assists before the Kitchener Rangers defeated Plymouth.

Going into the 2012 NHL Entry Draft, the NHL Central Scouting Bureau ranked Wilson the 15th-highest prospect among all available North American skaters. That year, the Washington Capitals selected him in the first round, 16th overall, of the draft. On July 18, 2012, Wilson signed a three-year, entry-level contract with the Capitals, with the expectation that he would continue to play with Plymouth for the following season.

Wilson began the 2012–13 season with Plymouth, scoring 36 points and recording 59 penalty minutes in his first 31 games with the team. When the NHL returned to play in January 2013 after the lockout, Wilson was invited to the Capitals' training camp, where he practiced alongside veterans like Alexander Ovechkin and Nicklas Backstrom before he was returned to Plymouth. After being drafted, Wilson's behaviour on the ice began to change: he focused on point production by emulating Tomas Holmstrom of the Detroit Red Wings, and Whalers coach Mike Vellucci discouraged Wilson from fighting, with the implication that he was too important of a prospect to suffer injury or suspension. Wilson finished his junior ice hockey career with 17 points and 41 penalty minutes in 12 playoff games.

Professional

2013–16 
After the Plymouth season ended, Wilson joined the Hershey Bears, the Capitals' American Hockey League (AHL) affiliate. He spent three games in Hershey before being called up to the Capitals for Game 5 of the 2013 Eastern Conference quarterfinals against the New York Rangers. He debuted on May 10, 2013, playing on the Capitals' fourth line. In only his second NHL game, Wilson broke the blade on his left skate while attempting to forecheck a member of the Rangers, and had to be assisted back to the bench by forward Jason Chimera. The Rangers ultimately took the series in seven games.

Going into the 2013–14 NHL season, the Capitals, who were struck by the NHL salary cap, appointed Wilson and fellow 19-year-old Connor Carrick to their roster in order to save money. Although he did not score a goal in his first 10 games, the Capitals chose to retain Wilson on their roster in order to fill the enforcer role that had been left vacant when Matt Hendricks chose to sign with the Nashville Predators. Wilson took part in his first NHL fight on October 3, 2013, battling Lance Bouma of the Calgary Flames and receiving a five-minute major penalty. His first goal came on November 6, scoring the last point in a 6–2 rout of the New York Islanders. Wilson's first serious hit as an enforcer came the following month, when he charged Brayden Schenn of the Philadelphia Flyers. Wilson was ejected from the game and received a call from the NHL Department of Player Safety for the incident, but did not receive any supplemental discipline. Wilson was one of only three NHL rookies that season to appear in all 82 regular-season games, scoring 10 points while participating in 14 fights and recording 151 penalty minutes.

Over the summer, while preparing to return to the Capitals, Wilson suffered a broken left fibula. He underwent surgery on July 8, 2014, with no expected time frame for his return to the NHL. When he joined the team at the start of the season, it was only for non-contact practice, and he was briefly assigned to Hershey for a three-game rehab stint at the end of October. When he returned to the team in November, it was on the top offensive line with Ovechkin and Backstrom, where he engaged in five fights through his first 13 games of the season. On March 27, 2015, Wilson received his first fine from the Department of Player Safety. After being warned for diving and embellishment on March 1 in a game against the Toronto Maple Leafs, Wilson was ordered to pay a $2,000 fine for the same penalty against Zach Parise of the Minnesota Wild. Wilson admitted, at the end of the season, that his leg injury had affected his stamina throughout the season; in 67 regular-season games, he scored only 17 points while posting 172 penalty minutes, and he registered only one point in 13 playoff games. Wilson also drew controversy during the playoffs for a hit on Lubomir Visnovsky of the Islanders, who had to be removed from the game. Wilson did not receive any punishment besides a two-minute minor penalty, while Islanders captain John Tavares referred to the hit as "a complete target of a defenseless player".

Wilson found his place on the Capitals during the 2015–16 season, logging more minutes than in the past two seasons while being called upon for penalty kill situations. His aggressive style of play, meanwhile, continued to generate more controversy. On December 10, 2015, Wilson received a five-minute major penalty and a game misconduct for boarding Brian Campbell of the Florida Panthers, a hit that led to calls for additional punishment. The following week, Wilson was given a match penalty for an illegal check to the head of Curtis Lazar of the Ottawa Senators. The penalty was rescinded upon further review after the league found that Wilson had initially made contact with Lazar's hip, and the apparent head injury was the result of whiplash. On April 29, 2016, during the 2016 Stanley Cup playoffs, Wilson was fined $2,403.67, the maximum amount allowable under the NHLPA Collective Bargaining Agreement, for a knee-on-knee collision with Conor Sheary of the Pittsburgh Penguins. The following day, he explained to reporters that the hit was an accidental result of a "bluff check" on Sheary. Playing on the third line for the better part of the season, Wilson scored seven goals and 16 assists in all 82 regular-season games. He dropped to the fourth line for the playoffs, scoring one assist in 12 games.

2016–18 
On June 30, 2016, the Capitals signed Wilson as a restricted free agent to a two-year, $4 million contract. He told reporters that his goal for the 2016-17 NHL season was to shed his reputation as a physical player and focus more on improving his scoring. On December 31, 2016, Wilson collided with New Jersey Devils defenceman John Moore, who was carried off the ice on a stretcher and was later hospitalized with a concussion. An NHL spokesman told reporters the next day that Wilson would not be fined or suspended for the hit. Wilson's point production dropped during the 2016–17 regular season, with only 19 points in 82 games. However, his performance at the 2017 Stanley Cup playoffs surpassed previous playoff appearances, with three goals in four games against the Toronto Maple Leafs. After scoring the overtime-winning goal in Game 1, Wilson scored two goals in Game 4. The Capitals ultimately lost in the second round of the playoffs to the Penguins.

Wilson received his first two suspensions during the 2017–18 preseason. First, on September 23, 2017, he received a two-game preseason suspension for interference against Robert Thomas of the St. Louis Blues. Then, on October 1, in the Capitals' preseason finale, Wilson received a four-game suspension as a repeat offender for a hit on Blues forward Sammy Blais. When he returned to the line-up, Wilson found an offensive rhythm on the top line with Ovechkin and Backstrom: in his first 13 games, he put up eight points and averaged nearly two minutes more of ice time per game than the season prior. By the end of the regular season, he had set a career-high 14 goals and 21 assists, but was also second to Micheal Haley with 187 penalty minutes. Wilson avoided a third suspension during the 2018 Stanley Cup playoffs, when he charged Alexander Wennberg of the Columbus Blue Jackets. Department of Player Safety decided not to pursue further disciplinary action as they could not determine, based on the available cameras, whether Wilson's main point of contact was Wennberg's head.

As the Stanley Cup playoffs progressed, Wilson's hits on his opponents continued to draw scrutiny. On April 29, 2018, in Game 2 of the Eastern Conference semifinals, Wilson made contact with the head of Penguins defenceman Brian Dumoulin, forcing the latter to leave the game. Wilson's history of suspension, combined with a growing controversy over headshots during the NHL postseason, further heated the incident, which was eventually ruled an "unfortunate hockey play". In the next game, Wilson's shoulder collided with the head of Zach Aston-Reese, giving the latter a concussion and a broken jaw that would require surgery. Wilson was labelled a "headhunter" and dirty player on social media, and received a three-game postseason suspension from the NHL. Wilson delivered a final controversial hit of the season in Game 1 of the 2018 Stanley Cup Finals, on Jonathan Marchessault of the Vegas Golden Knights. Wilson received a minor penalty for what he declared "a good clean hit", while Marchessault argued that the hit should be reviewed. Wilson ultimately helped take the Capitals to their third Stanley Cup victory, recording 15 total points, with at least one point in 11 of the 21 playoff games in which he appeared. This included two goals and one assist in the Cup finals, which Washington took from Las Vegas in five games. Wilson was one of several players asked to deliver a short speech during the Stanley Cup parade at the National Mall following the Capitals' victory, saying, "They say what happens in Vegas stays in Vegas, but we brought the cup home." Wilson and the Capitals' successful postseason run was somewhat overshadowed by his second-round suspension, and Wilson thanked his teammates for supporting him through the "tough situation" and continuing in his absence.

2018–21 
Following his Stanley Cup performance, the Capitals re-signed Wilson to a six-year contract on July 27, 2018, with an average annual value of $5.17 million. On October 3, 2018, Wilson received a 20-game suspension for a preseason hit on Oskar Sundqvist of the St. Louis Blues. The impact of the hit, which left Sundqvist on the injured list, as well as the frequency of Wilson's suspensions, resulted in the long suspension length. The NHL referred to the incident, which was Wilson's fourth suspension in 105 games, as "unprecedented". Wilson attempted to appeal the league's decision, arguing that the head contact he made with Sundqvist was unavoidable, but the decision was upheld by NHL Commissioner Gary Bettman on October 25. Following Bettman's decision, Wilson filed an additional appeal from a neutral arbitrator, and had his suspension reduced to 14 games. Wilson was allowed to play with the Capitals on November 13 for the Capitals' match against the Minnesota Wild. In the first game after his suspension, Wilson scored a goal, drew a minor penalty for goaltender interference, and engaged in a fight with Wild skater Marcus Foligno.

On November 30, only nine games after returning from his suspension, Wilson was ejected from a game against the New Jersey Devils for a late hit against Brett Seney. The match penalty received an automatic review, but Wilson faced no additional discipline from the Department of Player Safety. At the time of the hit, Wilson had scored seven goals in nine games and had extended his goal streak to five games. Wilson used his history of suspensions to change his approach to the ice, putting less emphasis on the physical aspect of his game and setting career highs with 22 goals and 40 points in 63 regular-season games. As the Capitals entered the 2019 Stanley Cup playoffs, however, Wilson's teammates and coaches worried that his restrained approach could not continue among the heightened tensions of postseason hockey. One of the strongest hits that he delivered, elbowing Greg McKegg of the Carolina Hurricanes during the Eastern Conference semifinals, went without penalty. The Hurricanes took the series with a double-overtime Game 7.

Wilson's shift towards point production over hits continued into the 2019–20 season, when, by the holiday break, he had reached a career high 0.68 points per game, alongside a career low 1.61 penalty minutes per game. By the time that the regular NHL season was suspended in March due to the COVID-19 pandemic, Wilson was one goal shy of his career high, with 21 goals in 68 games. When the NHL returned to play for the 2020 Stanley Cup playoffs in Toronto, Wilson was one of 31 Capitals invited to play in the "bubble". For the second year in a row, Washington failed to advance past the first round of playoffs, falling in five games to the Islanders.

The 2020–21 NHL season brought more controversy for Wilson's playing style, beginning with a "very big, and very late" hit on Mark Jankowski of the Penguins at the end of February. This was followed by a hit on Brandon Carlo of the Boston Bruins on March 5, which resulted in Carlo being transported to the hospital in an ambulance. Bruins coach Bruce Cassidy referred to the incident as a "predatory hit from a player who's done that before", while Carlo's teammate Brad Marchand referred to it as a "bullshit hit". Although referees did not call an on-ice penalty for the hit, the Department of Player Safety later suspended Wilson for seven games, requiring him to forfeit over $300,000 of his salary to the NHL Players' Emergency Assistance Fund. On May 4, the NHL and Department of Player Safety came under fire when they chose not to suspend Wilson for a fight against New York Rangers skaters Pavel Buchnevich and Artemi Panarin. Wilson first hit Buchnevich before removing Panarin's helmet and throwing him into the ice. Panarin was forced to miss the remainder of the season, while the Rangers released a statement declaring George Parros, the head of the Department of Player Safety, "unfit to continue in his current role". The controversy was amplified when, the following day, Shayne Gostisbehere of the Flyers was suspended two games for a hit against Mark Friedman of the Penguins. Unlike Wilson, Gostisbehere had never before received an NHL suspension. On May 7, 2021, Wilson told reporters that he had reached out to Panarin and that he wished to move on from the incident. After scoring 13 goals and 20 assists during the regular season, Wilson opened the scoring for the 2021 Stanley Cup playoffs with a shot against Tuukka Rask of the Bruins. That goal would be the only even-strength point drawn from one of the Capitals' top-six forwards as they fell to the Bruins in five games.

When Alexander Ovechkin was placed on COVID-19 protocols, Wilson, who had 13 goals and 18 assists by the midway point of the  season, was named as his replacement for the 2022 NHL All-Star Game.

International play 

Wilson first represented Canada internationally at the 2011 World U-17 Hockey Challenge. Playing on the gold medal-winning Canada Ontario team, Wilson injured his wrist on a breakaway, leaving Mathew Campagna to take a penalty shot in the 5–3 win over the United States. In four games at the U-17 tournament, Wilson scored one assist and recorded six penalty minutes. That same year, Wilson represented Canada at the 2011 Ivan Hlinka Memorial Tournament, capturing another gold medal with three goals in five games.

Playing style and criticism 

Wilson, standing  and weighing , has been described as a power forward, with a strong scoring record and a highly physical approach to the ice. Wilson's teammate on the Capitals, forward Brendan Leipsic, has said that Wilson's size gives the hits that he makes on opponents a distinctive "crunch", telling reporters that Wilson's particular danger lies not just in his size but the pace with which he attacks. He has also been described as an enforcer and a "goon", particularly in response to his May 2021 hit on Artemi Panarin. Wilson's physically-intensive style of play has been criticized by opponents and sports journalists as an artifact of an older era of NHL play. Stu Grimson, a former NHL enforcer, said, "If you put Tom Wilson back in the '90s, the early '80s, he's just one tough son of a bitch and no one thinks twice. But the game has evolved." A 2021 poll found that Wilson was the most hated NHL player on social media, with 47.9 percent of his impressions trending negative and 15.3 percent categorized as neutral.

Within the Capitals, Wilson has found a role as a defensive-minded forward to clear the way for linemates like Alexander Ovechkin and Evgeny Kuznetsov. As a rookie playing on the fourth line, Wilson was primarily tasked with defending his teammates by initiating fights with opponents, but as his offensive skill progressed and fighting became less frequent in the NHL, Wilson became more selective about his fights, believing that he was more valuable on the ice than serving a penalty. Wilson's disciplinary history has traditionally come in streaks: between the 2017 and 2018 preseasons, he served four suspensions in 105 games, and then avoided suspension again until March 2021.

Personal life 
Wilson has been active in charity work across the mid-Atlantic, including the Make-A-Wish Foundation, Teammates for Kids Foundation, Homeward Trails Animal Rescue, and Hockey Fights Cancer. During the 2018–19 NHL season, Wilson launched a partner program with Make-A-Wish called Forty Three's Friends, which offers Capitals game tickets to Make-A-Wish children and involves a personal meet-and-greet with Wilson after the game. The following year, he expanded the program to include veterans from the United Heroes League. In 2019, the Capitals nominated Wilson for the King Clancy Memorial Trophy, given to a significant humanitarian contributor in the NHL.

Wilson is married to professional beach volleyball player Taylor Pischke. The couple began dating in 2015 after meeting at one of Pischke's volleyball tournaments, and became engaged on July 23, 2021. They were married on August 27, 2022. In 2020, shortly before the COVID-19 pandemic forced the suspension of the NHL season, the couple adopted a Labrador retriever puppy named Halle.

Career statistics

Regular season and playoffs
Bold indicates led league

Source:

International

Awards

References

External links
 

1994 births
Canadian ice hockey right wingers
Hershey Bears players
Living people
National Hockey League first-round draft picks
Plymouth Whalers players
Ice hockey people from Toronto
Stanley Cup champions
Washington Capitals draft picks
Washington Capitals players